Jamestown Township is a township in Blue Earth County, Minnesota, United States. The population was 628 as of the 2000 census.

History
Jamestown Township was organized in 1858, and named after Jamestown, Virginia.

Geography

The vast majority of the city of Madison Lake is within the township geographically but is a separate entity.

Major highway
  Minnesota State Highway 60

Lakes
 Albert Lake
 Ballantyne Lake
 Duck Lake
 Eagle Lake (east edge)
 George Lake
 Gilfillin Lake (northeast three-quarters)
 Lake Washington
 Long Lake
 Madison Lake (northwest quarter)
 Mud Lake

Adjacent townships
 Washington Township, Le Sueur County (north)
 Elysian Township, Le Sueur County (east)
 Janesville Township, Waseca County (southeast)
 Le Ray Township (south)
 Mankato Township (southwest)
 Lime Township (west)
 Kasota Township, Le Sueur County (northwest)

Cemeteries
The township includes the following cemeteries: Calvary and Sugar Grove.

Demographics
As of the census of 2000, there were 628 people, 231 households, and 182 families residing in the township. There were 354 housing units at an average density of 23.1/sq mi (8.9/km). The racial makeup of the township was 99.68% White, and 0.32% from two or more races. Hispanic or Latino of any race were 0.64% of the population.

There were 231 households, out of which 34.2% had children under the age of 18 living with them, 72.7% were married couples living together, 3.0% had a female householder with no husband present, and 21.2% were non-families. 17.7% of all households were made up of individuals, and 6.1% had someone living alone who was 65 years of age or older.  The average household size was 2.72 and the average family size was 3.09.

In the township the population was spread out, with 26.3% under the age of 18, 6.5% from 18 to 24, 25.3% from 25 to 44, 30.4% from 45 to 64, and 11.5% who were 65 years of age or older.  The median age was 40 years. For every 100 females, there were 103.2 males.  For every 100 females age 18 and over, there were 103.1 males.

The median income for a household in the township was $56,875, and the median income for a family was $62,188. Males had a median income of $36,071 versus $27,353 for females. The per capita income for the township was $26,014.  About 2.8% of families and 3.6% of the population were below the poverty line, including 2.5% of those under age 18 and none of those age 65 or over.

References
 United States National Atlas
 United States Census Bureau 2007 TIGER/Line Shapefiles
 United States Board on Geographic Names (GNIS)

Townships in Blue Earth County, Minnesota
Mankato – North Mankato metropolitan area
Townships in Minnesota